The King's Pavilion is a building in Old Aberdeen owned by the University of Aberdeen.

History 
The building was opened in 1941 by the chancellor of the university James Meston, 1st Baron Meston. It was designed by Alexander George Robertson Mackenzie. It replaced an earlier sports pavilion.

The building was Category B listed in 1967.

Facilities 
The building contains a gym and changing facilities. The building also contains a swimming pool which is now disused following the opening of the swimming pools at the Aberdeen Sports Village.

References 

Category B listed buildings in Aberdeen
Sports venues in Aberdeen
Sports venues completed in 1941
University of Aberdeen
University swimming in the United Kingdom